Palo Pinto County is a county located in the U.S. state of Texas. As of the 2020 census, its population was 28,409. The county seat is Palo Pinto. The county was created in 1856 and organized the following year.

Palo Pinto County comprises the Mineral Wells micropolitan statistical area, which is part of the Dallas–Fort Worth combined statistical area. It is located in the western Cross Timbers ecoregion.

History

Native Americans

The Brazos Indian Reservation, founded by General Randolph B. Marcy in 1854, provided a safety area from warring Comanche for Delaware, Shawnee, Tonkawa, Wichita, Choctaw, and Caddo.  Within the reservation, each tribe had its own village and cultivated agricultural crops. Government-contracted beef cattle were delivered each week. Citizens were unable to distinguish between reservation and nonreservation tribes, blaming Comanche and Kiowa depredations on the reservation Indians. A newspaper in Jacksboro, Texas, titled The White Man  advocated removal of all tribes from North Texas.

During December 1858, Choctaw Tom, who was a Yowani married to a Hasinai woman, who was at times an interpreter to Sam Houston, and a group of reservation Indians received permission for an off-the-reservation hunt. On December 27, Captain Peter Garland and a vigilante group charged Choctaw Tom's camp, indiscriminately murdering and injuring women and children along with the men. .

Governor Hardin Richard Runnels ordered John Henry Brown to the area with 100 troops. An examining trial was conducted about the Choctaw Tom raid, but no indictments resulted.

In May 1859, John Baylor and a number of whites confronted United States troops at the reservation, demanding the surrender of certain tribal individuals. The military balked, and Baylor retreated, but in so doing killed an Indian woman and an old man. Baylor's group was later attacked by Indians off the reservation, where the military had no authority to intervene.  At the behest of terrified settlers, the reservation was abandoned that year.

County established

In 1856, the Texas State Legislature established Palo Pinto County from Bosque and Navarro Counties and named it for Palo Pinto Creek. The county was organized the next year, with the town of Golconda chosen to be the seat of government. The town was renamed Palo Pinto in 1858.

Early ranching and farming years

Ranching entrepreneurs Oliver Loving  and Charles Goodnight, who blazed the Goodnight-Loving Trail, along with Reuben Vaughan, were the nucleus of the original settlers.  An 1876 area rancher meeting regarding cattle rustling became the beginnings of what is now known as the Texas and Southwestern Cattle Raisers Association.

The Fence Cutting Wars in Texas lasted about 5 years, 1883–1888.  As farmers and ranchers began to compete for precious land and water, cattlemen found feeding their herds more difficult, prompting cowboys to cut through fences.  Texas Governor John Ireland prodded a special assembly to order the fence cutters to cease.  In response, the legislature made fence-cutting and pasture-burning crimes punishable with prison time, while at the same time regulating fencing. The practice abated with sporadic incidents of related violence in 1888.

Later growth years

James and Amanda Lynch first moved to the area in 1877. In digging a well on their property, they discovered the water seemed to benefit their well-being.  Word spread about the water's healing powers, and people from all over came to experience the benefits.  Eventually, the town of Mineral Wells was platted. The Mineral Wells State Park was opened to the public in 1981.

The Texas National Guard organized the 56th Cavalry Brigade in 1921, and four years later, Brigadier General Jacob F. Wolters was given a grant to construct a training camp for the unit. In 1941, Camp Wolters was turned over to the United States Army. It was redesignated Wolters Air Force Base in 1951. Five years later, the base reverted to the Army as a helicopter training school .  The base closed in 1973 when the helicopter school transferred to Fort Rucker in Alabama.

Possum Kingdom Lake was acquired from the Brazos River Authority in 1940. The Civilian Conservation Corps constructed the facilities, and the Possum Kingdom State Park opened to the public in 1950.

Geography

Features
 Palo Pinto Mountains
 Brazos River
 Possum Kingdom Lake

Major highways
  Interstate 20
  U.S. Highway 180
  U.S. Highway 281
  State Highway 16
  State Highway 108

Adjacent counties
 Jack County (north)
 Parker County (east)
 Hood County (southeast)
 Erath County (south)
 Eastland County (southwest)
 Stephens County (west)
 Young County (northwest)

Demographics

Note: the US Census treats Hispanic/Latino as an ethnic category. This table excludes Latinos from the racial categories and assigns them to a separate category. Hispanics/Latinos can be of any race.

As of the census of 2000,  27,026 people, 10,594 households, and 7,447 families were residing in the county. The population density was 28 people/sq mi (11/km2). The 14,102 housing units  averaged 15/sq mi (6/km2). The racial makeup of the county was 88.19% White, 2.32% African American, 0.67% Native American, 0.53% Asian, 6.59% from other races, and 1.71% from two or more races. About 13.57% of the population were Hispanics or Latinos of any race.

Of the 10,594 households, 30.40% had children under 18 living with them, 55.60% were married couples living together, 10.40% had a female householder with no husband present, and 29.70% were not families. About 26.20% of all households were made up of individuals, and 12.90% had someone living alone who was 65 or older. The average household size was 2.52, and the average family size was 3.02. As of the 2010 census,  2.0 same-sex couples per 1,000 households were in the county.

In the county, the age distribution was 26.0% under 18, 8.2% from 18 to 24, 25.9% from 25 to 44, 23.6% from 45 to 64, and 16.4% who were 65 or older. The median age was 38 years. For every 100 females, there were 96.70 males. For every 100 females age 18 and over, there were 92.30 males.

The median income for a household was $31,203, and for a family was $36,977. Males had a median income of $28,526 versus $18,834 for females. The per capita income for the county was $15,454. About 12.30% of families and 15.90% of the population were below the poverty line, including 20.50% of those under age 18 and 11.80% of those age 65 or over.

Communities

Cities
 Gordon
 Graford
 Mineral Wells (partly in Parker County)
 Mingus
 Strawn

Census-designated place
 Palo Pinto (county seat)

Other unincorporated communities
 Brazos
 Oran
 Santo

Notable people
 Steve Tyrell, singer and recording artist
 Glenn Rogers, Republican member of the Texas House of Representatives from District 60 (2021–present)

Politics

See also

 National Register of Historic Places listings in Palo Pinto County, Texas
 Recorded Texas Historic Landmarks in Palo Pinto County

References

External links

 
 Historic Palo Pinto County materials hosted by the Portal to Texas History
 

 
1857 establishments in Texas
Populated places established in 1857